The women's singles of the 2018 Advantage Cars Prague Open tournament was played on clay in Prague, Czech Republic.

Markéta Vondroušová was the defending champion, but chose not to participate.

Richèl Hogenkamp won the title, defeating Martina Di Giuseppe in the final, 6–4, 6–2.

Seeds

Draw

Finals

Top half

Bottom half

References

External Links
Main Draw

Advantage Cars Prague Open - Singles
Advantage Cars Prague Open